The St Mellion Estate, formerly St Mellion International Resort, is a hotel with golf and other recreational facilities in the parish of St Mellion, near Saltash, in east Cornwall.

St Mellion, which comprises a hotel, conference facilities, health club, spa and two championship golf courses, is owned and operated by Crown Golf, and was purchased via American Golf (UK) from American Golf Corporation. American Golf previously took ownership of the resort in 1998.

Golf courses and history

Old Course
The Old Course, the St Mellion estate's first course, was laid out on the potato farm of Hermon and Martin Bond and opened in 1976. Beginning in 2008 the golf course was significantly altered as part of a £20-million redevelopment of the complex.  The changes included the construction of 9 new golf holes which were redesignated as part of the Kernow Course from May 2010.

Jack Nicklaus Signature Course
The course designed by Jack Nicklaus was officially opened in 1988 with the hosting of a USA vs GB match featuring Jack Nicklaus (himself) and Tom Watson representing the USA against Sandy Lyle and Nick Faldo representing Great Britain. The Nicklaus course hosted the Benson & Hedges International Open on 7 occasions between 1979 and 1995, and has twice hosted The English Seniors Open.

St Mellion's Nicklaus Course is a contender for future PGA European Tour events, following its £100 million redevelopment completed in 2010. However St Mellion's initially-proposed hosting of the English Open tournament was postponed after the developers ran into financial difficulties following the credit crunch.

Scorecard

The scorecard for the Nicklaus Course from the championship yardage is given below:

Kernow Course
The Kernow Course, St Mellion's newer course which opened in 2010, takes its name from the Cornish for Cornwall. It was designed by Alan Leather and incorporates parts of the Old Course.

Competitions hosted

European Tour

Benson & Hedges International Open
St Mellion has hosted the Benson & Hedges International Open on the European Tour on 7 occasions.

St. Mellion Timeshare TPC
St Mellion also hosted the Tournament Players Championship (United Kingdom) (St. Mellion Timeshare TPC) on the European Tour in 1983 and 1984.

European Senior Tour
St Mellion has twice hosted the English Seniors Open on the European Senior Tour.

Amateur competitions

English Amateur
St Mellion hosted the English Amateur in 1999.

References

External links

St Mellion International Resort - official site
Crown Golf - official site
English Open - official site

Golf clubs and courses in Cornwall
Golf clubs and courses designed by Jack Nicklaus
Sports venues in Cornwall
Sport in Cornwall
Tourist attractions in Cornwall
Hotel buildings completed in 2010